Listen may refer to:
 The action of listening
 Central auditory system listening is how the brain processes what you hear
 Listening behaviour types in human communication

Computing
 LISTEN, a TCP connection state on the server side indicating a port waiting for new client connections
 Listen server, a type of game server
 listen(), a function provided by the Berkeley sockets API
 Project LISTEN, developing reading-tutorial software using speech recognition

Music

Albums
 Listen (C21 album), 2004
 Listen (Christy Moore album), 2009
 Listen (Cindy Morgan album), 1996
 Listen (David Guetta album), 2014
 Listen (Doug Raney album), 1981
 Listen (Emanuel and the Fear album), 2010
 Listen (A Flock of Seagulls album), 1983
 Listen (Jordan Rudess album), 1993
 Listen (The Kooks album), 2014
 Listen (Paul Rogers album), 2002
 Listen (Tim Bowman Jr. album), 2016
 Listen (TQ album), 2004
 Listen (EP), by Stonefree, 2004
 Listen: The Very Best Of, by Herbs, 2002
 Listen: The Very Best of Jenny Morris, 2004
 Listennn... the Album, by DJ Khaled, 2006
 Listen, by Bondy Chiu
 Listen, by The Chordettes
 Listen, by Michelle Tumes
Listen!, by Barbee Boys

Songs
 "Listen" (Beyoncé song), 2007
 "Listen" (Collective Soul song), 1997
 "Listen" (David Guetta song), 2014
 "Listen!!!", by Talib Kweli
 "Listen", by Bic Runga from Birds
 "Listen", by Chad Brownlee from Love Me or Leave Me
 "Listen", by Chicago from The Chicago Transit Authority
 "Listen", by The Clash from Capital Radio One
 "Listen", by Haley Reinhart from Better
 "Listen", by Julian Lennon from Help Yourself
 "Listen", by Tears For Fears from Songs from the Big Chair
 "Listen", by Toad The Wet Sprocket from Dulcinea

Other uses
 Listen (2013 film), a 2013 film
 Listen (2020 film), a 2020 film
Listen, a 2015 film featuring Micah Hauptman
 "Listen" (Doctor Who), a 2014 episode of Doctor Who
 Listen, a brand name of estradiol enanthate/algestone acetophenide, a form of birth control
 Listen (horse) (foaled 2005), Irish racehorse

See also
 Listener (disambiguation)
 Listening (disambiguation)